Events from the year 1716 in Sweden

Incumbents
 Monarch – Charles XII

Events

 February – Charles XII gives Georg Heinrich von Görtz the responsibility of internal affairs. 
 8 April – Swedish Wismar is taken. 
 6 September – Charles XII makes Lund his base. 
 
 
 
 
 
 - Suecia antiqua et hodierna by Erik Dahlbergh.

Births

 30 January - Carl Fredrik Adelcrantz, architect  (died 1796) 
 - Pehr Kalm, botanist, naturalist  (died 1779) 
 - Karl Gustaf Ekeberg, explorer (died 1784) 
 - Anna Margareta Salmelin, war heroine  (died 1789)

Deaths

 
 - Carl Piper, politician   (born 1647)

References

 
Years of the 18th century in Sweden
Sweden